Ponte de Gimonde is a bridge in Portugal. It is located in Bragança District.

See also
List of bridges in Portugal

Bridges in Bragança District
Roman bridges in Portugal
Listed bridges in Portugal